Alicia Ashley (born August 23, 1967) is a women's boxing participant who is the former WBC female world super bantamweight champion. Ashley is a Jamaican-American. Born in Jamaica, she moved to the United States at a young age.  She is the younger sister of chess grandmaster Maurice Ashley and former world kickboxing champion Devon Ashley.

Career
Ashley began her professional boxing career on January 29, 1999, defeating Lisa Howarth by a six-round split decision, at Atlantic City, New Jersey. On her second professional boxing fight, held at Halifax, Nova Scotia, Canada, she suffered her first defeat, when she was outpointed over six rounds by Doris Hackl on June 20 of that year.

Ashley rebounded from that defeat with an eight-round decision win over Bonnie Canino June 27 at Tunica, Mississippi.

After her first three fights, she took a seven-month hiatus from boxing, but on February 11, 2000, she returned, losing by an eight-round decision to Mexico's Laura Serrano, also in Tunica. After splitting her two next fights, she met "Downtown Leona Brown": on June 29, she beat Brown on points over eight rounds at Philadelphia, Pennsylvania. Next, she fought Kelsey Jeffries, who, until that bout had lost only one of her nine fights. On September 3, Ashley beat Jeffries by a six-round unanimous decision in Nevada.

Ashley had only one fight in 2001, a decision victory, and then, on January 13, 2002, she made her Las Vegas debut, drawing (tying) in six rounds with Layla McCarter.

Her next fight, fought on February 23 of that year, was also her first world title try, when she and Jeffries were rematched with the vacant IWBF world Featherweight title on the line. Ashley became a world champion by defeating Jeffries, this time by a ten-round split decision, at New Jersey.

Ashley lost her next fight, when she met the experienced Chevelle Hallback, for Hallback's WIBA world Junior Lightweight title, by a ten-round unanimous decision, in Georgia on August 27.

Ashley then went down in weight, returning to the Super Bantamweight division. On November 15, she defeated Marcela Acuña by a ten-round split decision in Córdoba, Argentina, to win the WIBF's vacant world Super Bantamweight title. But this decision win was controversial (the fight was scored 96-94 by two judges for Ashley, and 97-95 by the third for Acuña), and the WIBF ordered an immediate rematch between the two women fighters. On June 14, 2003, she and Acuña met again, this time at Buenos Aires. The second time around, Ashley retained the title with a ten-round unanimous decision.

On November 15, she lost her title to Esther Schouten by a ten-round split decision in Austria.

Her next was against Shondell Alfred, on March 27, 2004, in Guyana. She defeated Alfred by an eight-round decision.

After a hiatus that lasted almost one year, Ashley returned to boxing on March 3, 2005. when she knocked out Elena Reid in seven rounds, at Laughlin. She also fought in the World Combat League.

She lost the fight against Argentina's Marcela Eliana Acuna for the WBC female world super bantamweight title by a majority decision at the Estadio Luna Park in Buenos Aires on August 20, 2009.

After winning two fights in New York City, Ashley won the vacant WBC female super bantamweight title via a unanimous decision at the Hunts Point Produce Market in the Bronx on July 23, 2011. on 2016 Oct 01 in dort federal event center in Flint Michigan Alicia Ashley loss her title to Fatuma Zarika by split decision

As of July 2011, Ashley has never lost a fight by knockout.

As of March 2018, Ashley has been inactive.

Professional boxing record 

|-
| style="text-align:center;" colspan="8"|24 Wins (4 knockouts), 12 Losses, 1 Drawn
|-  style="text-align:center; background:#e3e3e3;"
|  style="border-style:none none solid solid; "|Res.
|  style="border-style:none none solid solid; "|Record
|  style="border-style:none none solid solid; "|Opponent
|  style="border-style:none none solid solid; "|Type
|  style="border-style:none none solid solid; "|RoundTime
|  style="border-style:none none solid solid; "|Date
|  style="border-style:none none solid solid; "|Location
|  style="border-style:none none solid solid; "|Notes
|- align=center
|Loss||24-12-1||align=left| Dina Thorslund
|
|
|
|align=left|
|align=left|
|- align=center
|Win||24-11-1||align=left| Liliana Martinez
|
|
|
|align=left|
|align=left|
|- align=center
|Loss||23-11-1||align=left| Fatuma Zarika
|
|
|
|align=left|
|align=left|
|- align=center
|Win||23-10-1||align=left| Christina McMahon
|
|
|
|align=left|
|align=left|
|- align=center
|Win||22-10-1||align=left| Grecia Nova
|
|
|
|align=left|
|align=left|
|- align=center
|Loss||21-10-1||align=left| Jackie Nava
|
|
|
|align=left|
|align=left|
|- align=center
|Win||21-9-1||align=left| Nohime Dennisson
|
|
|
|align=left|
|align=left|
|- align=center
|Win||20-9-1||align=left| Zenny Sotomayor
|
|
|
|align=left|
|align=left|
|- align=center
|Win||19-9-1||align=left| Chantal Martínez
|
|
|
|align=left|
|align=left|
|- align=center
|Win||18-9-1||align=left| Maria Elena Villalobos
|
|
|
|align=left|
|align=left|
|- align=center
|Win||17-9-1||align=left| Christina Ruiz
|
|
|
|align=left|
|align=left|
|- align=center
|Win||16-9-1||align=left| Crystal Hoy
|
|
|
|align=left|
|align=left|
|- align=center
|Win||15-9-1||align=left| Jackie Trivilino
|
|
|
|align=left|
|align=left|
|- align=center
|Loss||14-9-1||align=left| Marcela Eliana Acuña
|
|
|
|align=left|
|align=left|
|- align=center
|Loss||14-8-1||align=left| Lisa Brown
|
|
|
|align=left|
|align=left|
|- align=center
|Win||14-7-1||align=left| Brooke Dierdorff
|
|
|
|align=left|
|align=left|
|- align=center
|Win||13-7-1||align=left| Delia Hoppe
|
|
|
|align=left|
|align=left|
|- align=center
|Loss||12-7-1||align=left| Xiyan Zhang
|
|
|
|align=left|
|align=left|
|- align=center
|Loss||12-6-1||align=left| Myung Ok Ryu
|
|
|
|align=left|
|align=left|
|- align=center
|Win||12-5-1||align=left| Alesia Graf
|
|
|
|align=left|
|align=left|
|- align=center
|Win||11-5-1||align=left| Elena Reid
|
|
|
|align=left|
|align=left|
|- align=center
|Win||10-5-1||align=left| Shondell Alfred
|
|
|
|align=left|
|align=left|
|- align=center
|Loss||9-5-1||align=left| Esther Schouten
|
|
|
|align=left|
|align=left|
|- align=center
|Win||9-4-1||align=left| Marcela Eliana Acuña
|
|
|
|align=left|
|align=left|
|- align=center
|Win||8-4-1||align=left| Marcela Eliana Acuña
|
|
|
|align=left|
|align=left|
|- align=center
|Loss||7-4-1||align=left| Chevelle Hallback
|
|
|
|align=left|
|align=left|
|- align=center
|Win||7-3-1||align=left| Kelsey Jeffries
|
|
|
|align=left|
|align=left|
|- align=center
|Draw||6-3-1||align=left| Layla McCarter
|
|
|
|align=left|
|align=left|
|- align=center
|Win||6-3||align=left| Claudette Alexander
|
|
|
|align=left|
|align=left|
|- align=center
|Win||5-3||align=left| Kelsey Jeffries
|
|
|
|align=left|
|align=left|
|- align=center
|Win||4-3||align=left| Leona Brown
|
|
|
|align=left|
|align=left|
|- align=center
|Loss||3-3||align=left| Songul Oruc
|
|
|
|align=left|
|align=left|
|- align=center
|Win||3-2||align=left| Heather McVey
|
|
|
|align=left|
|align=left|
|- align=center
|Loss||2-2||align=left| Laura Serrano
|
|
|
|align=left|
|align=left|
|- align=center
|Win||2-1||align=left| Bonnie Canino
|
|
|
|align=left|
|align=left|
|- align=center
|Loss||1-1||align=left| Doris Hackl
|
|
|
|align=left|
|align=left|
|- align=center
|Win||1-0||align=left| Lisa Howarth
|
|
|
|align=left|
|align=left|
|- align=center

See also
 List of female boxers

References

External links
 Alicia Ashley at Awakening Fighters
 

1967 births
Living people
American women boxers
Jamaican women boxers
Jamaican emigrants to the United States
Super-bantamweight boxers
21st-century American women